Alexander Silva de Lucena (born 31 May 1999), commonly known as Alexander, is a Brazilian footballer who plays as a goalkeeper for Avaí, on loan from Vasco da Gama.

Career statistics

Club

Notes

References

External links

1999 births
Living people
Brazilian footballers
Association football goalkeepers
Campeonato Brasileiro Série A players
CR Vasco da Gama players
Avaí FC players
People from São Gonçalo, Rio de Janeiro
Sportspeople from Rio de Janeiro (state)